Březňák is a brand of a pilsner-type beer produced in Velké Březno near Ústí nad Labem, Czech Republic. It has been brewed since 1753. Since 2008, the Velké Březno Brewery is owned by the Heineken International group.

Products
Březňák Světlé výčepní – a 10° pale draught beer with 4.1% ABV.
Březňák 11 – a 11° pale lager with 4.6% ABV.
Březňák Ležák – a 12° pale lager with 4.9% ABV.
Březňák 14 – a 14° special beer with 6.5% ABV.

See also
Beer in the Czech Republic

References

External links

Březňák on Heineken website (in Czech)
Opinions on Březňák beer at RateBeer

Beer in the Czech Republic
Beer brands of the Czech Republic